Atkins School District is a public school district based in Atkins, Arkansas, United States. The Atkins School District provides early childhood, elementary and secondary education for more than 1,000 prekindergarten through grade 12 students at its three facilities in Pope County, which receive Title I funding.

It includes the communities of Atkins and Oak Grove.

The Atkins School District is accredited by the Arkansas Department of Education (ADE).

History
Jody Jenkins served as superintendent until 2020, when he died of COVID-19.

In 2021 the district decided to adopt a four week school day instead of a five week school day.

Schools 
In fall 2010, the district opened a  modern facility that houses the elementary and middle schools.

 Atkins High School—grades 9 through 12.
 Atkins Middle School—grades 5 through 8.
 Atkins Elementary School—prekindergarten through grade 4.

References

External links 

 
 
 
 

School districts in Arkansas
Education in Pope County, Arkansas